The 2012–13 UEFA Champions League qualifying phase and play-off round decided 10 of the 32 teams which played in the group stage.

All times are CEST (UTC+2).

Round and draw dates
All draws were held at UEFA headquarters in Nyon, Switzerland.

Format
There were two routes which the teams were separated into during qualifying:
Champions Route, which included all domestic champions which did not automatically qualify for the group stage.
League Route (also called the Non-champions Path or the Best-placed Path), which included all domestic non-champions which did not automatically qualify for the group stage.

Each tie was played over two legs, with each team playing one leg at home. The team that scored more goals on aggregate over the two legs advanced to the next round. In the event that aggregate score finished level, the away goals rule would be applied, i.e., the team that scored more goals away from home over the two legs advanced. If away goals were also equal, then thirty minutes of extra time would be played, divided into two fifteen-minutes halves. The away goals rule would again be applied after extra time, i.e., if there were goals scored during extra time and the aggregate score was still level, the visiting team would advance by virtue of more away goals scored. If no goals were scored during extra time, the tie would be decided by penalty shootout.

In the draws for each round, teams were seeded based on their 2012 UEFA club coefficients, with the teams divided into seeded and unseeded pots. A seeded team was drawn against an unseeded team, with the order of legs in each tie decided randomly. Due to the limited time between matches, the draws for the second and third qualifying rounds took place before the results of the previous round were known. The seeding in these draws (or in any cases where the results of a tie in the previous round were not known at the time of draw) was carried out under the assumption that the higher-ranked teams of the previous round would advance to this round, which means if a lower-ranked team were to advance, it would simply take the seeding of its defeated opponent. Prior to the draws, UEFA may form "groups" in accordance with the principles set by the Club Competitions Committee, but they were purely for convenience of the draw and for ensuring that teams from the same association were not drawn against each other, and did not resemble any real groupings in the sense of the competition.

Teams
Below were the 54 teams (40 in Champions Route, 14 in League Route) involved in the qualifying phase and play-off round, grouped by their starting rounds. The 10 winners of the play-off round (5 in Champions Route, 5 in League Route) qualified for the group stage to join the 22 automatic qualifiers. The losing teams from the third qualifying round and the play-off round dropped down to the Europa League play-off round and group stage respectively.

Champions Route

League Route

First qualifying round

Seeding

Summary

|}

Matches

F91 Dudelange won 11–0 on aggregate.

Valletta won 9–0 on aggregate.

0–0 on aggregate. Linfield won 4–3 on penalties.

Second qualifying round

Seeding

Notes

Matches

|}

First leg

Debrecen won 3–1 on aggregate.

Maribor won 6–2 on aggregate.

Ironi Kiryat Shmona won 2–1 on aggregate.

BATE Borisov won 3–2 on aggregate.

AEL Limassol won 3–0 on aggregate.

Ekranas won 2–1 on aggregate.

Basel won 5–0 on aggregate.

Helsingborg won 3–0 on aggregate.

HJK won 9–1 on aggregate.

Molde won 4–1 on aggregate.

4–4 on aggregate. F91 Dudelange won on away goals.

Slovan Liberec won 2–1 on aggregate.

Dinamo Zagreb won 4–3 on aggregate.

Neftchi Baku won 5–2 on aggregate.

Sheriff Tiraspol won 2–0 on aggregate.

Partizan won 7–2 on aggregate.

Śląsk Wrocław won 2–1 on aggregate.

Third qualifying round

Seeding

Notes

Summary

|+Champions Route

|}

|+League Route

|}

Matches

Maribor won 5–1 on aggregate.

BATE Borisov won 3–1 on aggregate.

CFR Cluj won 3–1 on aggregate.

Anderlecht won 11–0 on aggregate.

Helsingborg won 6–1 on aggregate.

Dinamo Zagreb won 5–0 on aggregate.

Basel won 2–1 on aggregate.

Celtic won 4–1 on aggregate.

Ironi Kiryat Shmona won 6–2 on aggregate.

AEL Limassol won 2–0 on aggregate.

Fenerbahçe won 5–2 on aggregate.

Panathinaikos won 5–0 on aggregate.

Copenhagen won 3–2 on aggregate.

Dynamo Kyiv won 3–1 on aggregate.

Play-off round

Seeding

Summary

|+Champions Route

|}

|+League Route

|}

Notes

Matches

CFR Cluj won 3–1 on aggregate.

Celtic won 4–0 on aggregate.

BATE Borisov won 3–1 on aggregate.

Anderlecht won 3–2 on aggregate.

Dinamo Zagreb won 3–1 on aggregate.

2–2 on aggregate. Braga won 5–4 on penalties.

Spartak Moscow won 3–2 on aggregate.

Málaga won 2–0 on aggregate.

Dynamo Kyiv won 4–3 on aggregate.

Lille won 2–1 on aggregate.

Statistics
There were 226 goals in 88 matches in the qualifying phase and play-off round, for an average of 2.57 goals per match.

Top goalscorers

Top assists

Notes

References

External links
2012–13 UEFA Champions League, UEFA.com

Qualifying Rounds
2012-13